Louis Verhelst (born 28 August 1990 in Menin) is a Belgian former professional cyclist.

Major results

2008
 1st Grand Prix Bati-Metallo
2011
 6th Paris–Roubaix Espoirs
 9th Dwars door de Antwerpse Kempen
 9th GP van de stad Geel
2012
 1st Stage 3 Tour de l'Eure-et-Loir
 1st Stage 4 Three Days of Cherbourg
 5th Paris–Roubaix Espoirs
 8th Grand Prix Criquielion
 9th De Kustpijl
 10th Ronde Pévéloise
2013
 Boucle de l'Artois
1st  Mountains classification
1st Stage 1
 1st Stage 1 Circuit des Ardennes
 1st Stage 1 Tour de Bretagne Cycliste
 5th Overall Course de la Solidarité Olympique
 5th Memorial Van Coningsloo
 8th Grand Prix de la Ville de Lillers
2014
 6th Halle–Ingooigem
 10th Overall World Ports Classic
2017
 2nd Overall Tour de Côte d'Ivoire
1st Stages 4, 5 & 6

References

External links

1990 births
Living people
Belgian male cyclists
People from Menen
Cyclists from West Flanders